Sing, Baby, Sing is a 1936 American film. Richard A. Whiting and Walter Bullock received an Academy Award nomination in Best Original Song at the 9th Academy Awards for their song "When Did You Leave Heaven".

Plot
After Joan Warren (Alice Faye) is fired from her singing job at the Ritz Club, where she performs with the Ritz Brothers, she seeks help from theatrical agent, Nicky Alexander (Gregory Ratoff). Nicky, however, is in the process of being evicted from his office suite, so he tells her to find another agent. When she insists that he represent her, he takes her to Mr. Brewster (Paul Stanton), president of the Federal Broadcasting Company, and Joan auditions, but Brewster refuses to hire her because she is not of the upper class.

Back at the club, Joan packs her bags, while in the street, a crowd gathers around drunken actor Bruce Farraday (Adolphe Menjou). Nicky leads Farraday into the club, where Farraday orders a huge feast and hears Joan perform her last song. After more wine, Farraday passes out, and they take him to a hospital, where he babbles lines of Shakespeare. To create some publicity, Nicky tells Joan to play "Juliet" to Farraday's "Romeo." While Al Craven (Ted Healy), the brother of Nicky's secretary Fitz (Patsy Kelly), searches for alcohol to keep Farraday from sobering up, Nicky calls the newspapers, saying that Farraday is on his deathbed. When the doctor arrives and forbids visitors, Al pretends to be Farraday's personal physician and relieves him of the case. Nicky sneaks Joan in to see Farraday, while cynical reporter Ted Blake (Michael Whalen) and Joe (Cully Richards), a photographer, climb onto the fire escape and photograph them.

Later, Al accompanies Farraday home, and the puzzled Farraday wonders why he can't remember hiring a personal physician. The newspapers print the story, and Brewster decides that he wants to hire Joan on the condition that Farraday will perform as well. At their new home at the Madison Towers, the group learns that Farraday is about to return to Hollywood at the behest of his cousin and business manager, Robert Wilson, who is furious over the publicity. Nicky goes to Farraday and suggests that he show his cousin that he has a head for business by getting the lucrative radio contract. Robert arrives, tells the newspapers that Joan is a gold digger and escorts Farraday onto the train leaving for California. As a result of the new story, Brewster no longer wants to sign Joan. Ted explains that to be the first to print a retraction of Robert's statement, his newspaper will fly Joan out to Farraday. They fly to Kansas City to meet Farraday's train and trick Robert into leaving without Farraday. Then, they arrange with Brewster to broadcast that evening from Kansas City. They round up some performers for the show, including the Ritz Brothers, who happen to be in town. As Farraday prepares to go on the air, Robert returns and locks himself in the hotel room with Farraday, but Farraday escapes. He arrives at the station in the nick of time and exonerates Joan, securing for her the radio contract with Brewster.

Cast 
Alice Faye as Joan Warren
Adolphe Menjou as Bruce Farraday
Gregory Ratoff as Nicholas K. Alexander
Ted Healy as Al Craven
Patsy Kelly as Fitz Craven
Michael Whalen as Ted Blake
The Ritz Brothers as Themselves
Montagu Love as Robert Wilson
Dixie Dunbar as Telephone Operator
Douglas Fowley as Mac
Paul Stanton as Brewster
Tony Martin as Tony Renaldo
Cully Richards as Joe
Stanley Blystone as Kelly
Sam McDaniel as Train Porter (uncredited)
Jerry Tucker as Wilson's Son (uncredited)

Soundtrack
Sing, Baby, Sing
by Lew Pollack and Jack Yellen

The Music Goes Round And Round
(1935) (uncredited)
Music by Edward Farley and Mike Riley,
Lyrics by Red Hodgson

When Did You Leave Heaven?
Music by Richard A. Whiting,
Lyrics by Walter Bullock

You Turned The Tables On Me
by Louis Alter and Sidney D. Mitchell

Love Will Tell
by Lew Pollack and Jack Yellen

References

External links 
 

1936 films
20th Century Fox films
Films directed by Sidney Lanfield
1936 musical films
Films produced by Darryl F. Zanuck
American black-and-white films
American musical films
1930s English-language films
1930s American films